The following is a list of notable deaths in January 2023.

Entries for each day are listed alphabetically by surname. A typical entry lists information in the following sequence:
 Name, age, country of citizenship at birth, subsequent country of citizenship (if applicable), reason for notability, cause of death (if known), and reference.

January 2023

1
Mario Artali, 84, Italian businessman and politician, deputy (1972–1976).
Francisco Bozinovic, 63, Chilean-Croatian biologist and academic, cancer.
Martin Davis, 94, American mathematician (Davis–Putnam algorithm).
N. C. Debbarma, 80, Indian politician, Tripura MLA (since 2018), stroke.
Georg Eberl, 86, German Olympic ice hockey player (1960).
Fan Weitang, 87, Chinese mining engineer, member of the Chinese Academy of Engineering.
Gangsta Boo, 43, American rapper (Three 6 Mafia).
Tetsuo Hasegawa, 84, Japanese actor (Mito Kōmon).
Viktor Ivanenko, 75, Russian security officer.
Bob Jongen, 95, German-born Dutch footballer (Alemannia Aachen, Fortuna 54, Roda Sport).
R. K. Krishna Kumar, 84, Indian entrepreneur (Tata Sons, Sir Dorabji Tata and Allied Trusts), heart attack.
Kuo Nan-hung, 86, Taiwanese politician, minister of transportation and communications (1987–1990) and president of the NCTU (1979–1987), COVID-19.
Ron Labinski, 85, American architect (Oracle Park, Raymond James Stadium, M&T Bank Stadium).
Edith Lank, 96, American author and advice columnist.
Elizabeth Livingstone, 93, English Anglican theologian.
Kadri Mälk, 64, Estonian visual artist and jewellery designer.
Frank McGarvey, 66, Scottish footballer (St Mirren, Celtic, national team), pancreatic cancer.
Art McNally, 97, American Hall of Fame football official, director of officiating for the NFL (1968–1991).
Kelly Monteith, 80, American comedian.
Meenakshi Narain, 58, Indian-born American experimental physicist.
Lise Nørgaard, 105, Danish journalist and writer (Matador).
Edith Pearlman, 86, American short story writer.
Apostolos Pitsos, 104, Greek industrialist and businessman.
Sir Michael Rawlins, 81, British clinical pharmacologist, chair of the MHRA (2014–2020).
Bohdan Rebryk, 84, Ukrainian political prisoner and politician, MP (1990–1994).
Bobby Rivard, 83, Canadian ice hockey player (Pittsburgh Penguins), complications from Alzheimer's disease.
Mako Sajko, 95, Slovenian director and screenwriter.
Jacques Sereys, 94, French actor (On Guard, Chouchou, Towards Zero).
Lázaro Valdés, 82, Cuban son and jazz musician.
Wang Hao, 92, Chinese military officer.
Fred White, 67, American Hall of Fame drummer (Earth, Wind & Fire).
Zhu Zushou, 77, Chinese diplomat, ambassador to Hungary (2003–2007) and the Netherlands (2001–2003), COVID-19.

2
Alain Acart, 71, French Olympic sprint canoer (1972, 1976), heart attack.
Lincoln Almond, 86, American politician and lawyer, governor of Rhode Island (1995–2003), U.S. attorney for the district of Rhode Island (1969–1978, 1981–1993).
Ken Block, 55, American rally driver (Rally America, Global Rallycross), co-founder of DC Shoes, snowmobile rollover.
Frank Cameron, 90, New Zealand cricketer (Otago, national team).
Suzy McKee Charnas, 83, American novelist (The Kingdom of Kevin Malone, The Holdfast Chronicles) and short story writer ("Boobs").
Molly Corbett Broad, 81, American academic administrator.
Catherine David, 73, French-American literary critic and novelist.
Roxanne Donnery, 79, American politician, cancer.
Andrew Downes, 72, British classical composer.
Cai Emmons, 71, American author and blogger, complications from amyotrophic lateral sclerosis.
Viktor Fainberg, 91, Russian philologist and Soviet dissident.
Frank Galati, 79, American theatre director (The Grapes of Wrath, Ragtime) and screenwriter (The Accidental Tourist), Tony winner (1990), cancer. 
Cliff Gustafson, 91, American Hall of Fame baseball coach (Texas Longhorns), heart failure.
Richard H. Hanson, 91, American politician, member of the Minnesota House of Representatives (1967–1968).
Nikos Hatzigiakoumis, 93, Greek Olympic rower (1956).
Bobby Hogue, 83, American politician, member of the Arkansas House of Representatives (1979–1998).
Kurt Horres, 90, German theatre director (Deutsche Oper am Rhein).
Hu Fuming, 87, Chinese philosopher and politician, COVID-19.
Thomas L. Hughes, 97, American government official, director of the Bureau of Intelligence and Research (1963–1969).
John Huo Cheng, 96, Chinese Roman Catholic prelate, bishop of Fenyang (since 1991).
Mubasshar Hussein, 79, Bangladeshi architect and independence activist.
Jean Nehr, 93, French actor (Summer of '62, Plus belle la vie).
Dumitru Radu Popescu, 87, Romanian novelist and poet.
Marilyn Stafford, 97, American-born British photographer.
Robert Stephan, 89, American lawyer, Kansas attorney general (1979–1995).
Siddeshwar Swami, 82, Indian Hindu religious leader.
Kajsa Thoor, 51, Swedish television presenter, apartment fire.
Abderrahim Tounsi, 86, Moroccan comedian.
Wang Zhiliang, 94, Chinese translator.

3
Armand Joel Banaken Bassoken, 39, Cameroonian footballer (Persewangi Banyuwangi, Persijap Jepara, PSPS Pekanbaru), traffic collision.
Karim Bennani, 87, Moroccan painter.
Alberto Borin, 82, Belgian politician, senator (1987–1991, 1994–1995) and MP (1995–1999).
James D. Brubaker, 85, American film producer (Rocky, Bruce Almighty, Gia), multiple strokes.
Danièle Brun, 84, French academic and psychologist.
Ib Christensen, 92, Danish politician, MP (1973–1975, 1977–1981), MEP (1984–1994).
Theo Coetzee, 74, South African politician, MP (2009–2014), cancer.
Walter Cunningham, 90, American astronaut (Apollo 7), complications from a fall.
Seble Desta, 91, Ethiopian princess.
Mohamed Enani, 83, Egyptian writer and translator.
Elena Huelva, 20, Spanish influencer and writer, Ewing sarcoma.
Laxman Pandurang Jagtap, 59, Indian politician, Maharashtra MLA (since 2009), cancer.
Ruslan Khasbulatov, 80, Russian economist and politician, chairman of the Supreme Soviet (1991–1993).
Greta Kiernan, 89, American politician, member of the New Jersey General Assembly (1978–1980).
Joseph Koo, 91, Hong Kong film composer (The Way of the Dragon, Fist of Fury, A Terra-Cotta Warrior).
Eric Low, 75, Singaporean politician.
James Lowenstein, 95, American diplomat, ambassador to Luxembourg (1977–1981).
Abdelsalam Majali, 97, Jordanian physician and politician, prime minister (1993–1995, 1997–1998).
Aleksey Malashenko, 71, Russian academic and political scientist.
Frederick J. Marshall, 71, American judge, justice of the New York Supreme Court (2000–2022), non-Hodgkin lymphoma.
Notis Mavroudis, 77, Greek guitarist and composer, fall.
Amber McLaughlin, 49, American convicted murderer, execution by lethal injection.
Mimosa, 62, French magician.
Silvio Parnis, 57, Maltese politician, MP (1998–2022), cancer.
Petr Pavlásek, 75, Czech Olympic weightlifter (1972, 1976).
Robbie Pierce, 63, American off-road racing driver, scuba diving accident.
Mitică Popescu, 86, Romanian actor (The Earth's Most Beloved Son, The Moromete Family, The Moment).
Alan Rankine, 64, Scottish musician (The Associates).
Nicolás Redondo, 95, Spanish union leader and politician, secretary general of the UGT (1976–1994) and deputy (1977–1987).
Jeremy Salmond, 79, New Zealand heritage architect, NZIA Gold Medal winner (2018).
Sergi Schaaff, 85, Spanish television producer (Saber y ganar, Ruta Quetzal).
Nate Thayer, 62, American journalist (Far Eastern Economic Review, Jane's Defence Weekly, Soldier of Fortune).
Giorgio Tombesi, 96, Italian politician, deputy (1976–1983).
Páll Vang, 73, Faroese politician, minister of agriculture, health, transport and justice (1981–1985).
Norbert Werbs, 82, German Roman Catholic prelate and theologian, auxiliary bishop of Schwerin (1981–1994) and Hamburg (1994–2015).
Zhao Qiguo, 92, Chinese soil scientist, member of the Chinese Academy of Sciences.
Zhou Lingzhao, 103, Chinese painter.
Lyuben Zidarov, 99, Bulgarian visual artist.

4
Richard Bernal, 73, Jamaican diplomat and economist.
Jean Bertho, 94, French actor (La Marie du port, The Doctor's Horrible Experiment) and film director.
Thomas Stonor, 7th Baron Camoys, 82, British banker and peer, lord chamberlain (1998–2000).
Edwin Chiloba, 24–25, Kenyan fashion designer and LGBTQ activist. (body discovered on this date)
Arthur Duncan, 97, American tap dancer (The Lawrence Welk Show, The Betty White Show).
Rei Jack Enoka, 83, Cook Islands politician, MP (1983, 1989–1994).
Thirumagan Evera, 46, Indian politician, Tamil Nadu MLA (since 2021), cardiac arrest.
Michel Ferté, 64, French racing driver (Formula 3000).
Norman Fruchter, 85, American writer and academic, injuries sustained in a traffic collision.
Renée Gailhoustet, 93, French architect.
Ge Xiurun, 88, Chinese engineer, member of the Chinese Academy of Engineering.
David Gold, 86, British retailer, publisher (Gold Star Publications), and football executive, chairman of West Ham United (since 2010).
Casey Hayden, 85, American civil rights activist.
Kléber Haye, 85, French engineer and politician, deputy (1981–1986).
Elwood Hillis, 96, American politician, member of the U.S. House of Representatives (1971–1987).
Stan Hitchcock, 86, American country singer, cancer.
Pierre Joassin, 74, Belgian film director and screenwriter (Maigret, Josephine, Guardian Angel).
Zoran Kalezić, 72, Serbian-Montenegrin singer, lung cancer.
Marie Kovářová, 95, Czech gymnast, Olympic champion (1948).
Wyllie Longmore, 82, Jamaican-born British actor (Love Actually), cancer.
Sławomir Maciejowski, 71, Polish Olympic rower (1972).
Alan Mackay-Sim, 71, Australian biomedical scientist.
Rosi Mittermaier, 72, German alpine skier, double Olympic champion (1976).
Géza Morcsányi, 70, Hungarian playwright and actor (On Body and Soul).
Calvin Muhammad, 64, American football player (Los Angeles Raiders, Washington Redskins, San Diego Chargers).
Marino Penna, 93, Chilean chemical engineer and politician, deputy (1965–1973).
Beeyar Prasad, 61, Indian lyricist (Kilichundan Mampazham, Njan Salperu Ramankutty, Vamanapuram Bus Route), complications from a stroke.
Volodymyr Radchenko, 74, Ukrainian politician and intelligence officer, vice prime minister (2007), minister of internal affairs (1994–1995) and twice head of the SBU.
Hans Rebele, 79, German footballer (1860 Munich, West Germany national team).
Sim Wong Hoo, 67, Singaporean entrepreneur, founder of Creative Technology.
Miiko Taka, 97, American actress (Sayonara, The Art of Love, Walk, Don't Run).
Maarten van Emden, 85, Dutch-Canadian mathematician and computer scientist.
Fay Weldon, 91, British author (The Life and Loves of a She-Devil, Puffball, The Cloning of Joanna May), essayist and playwright.
Wu Sheng, 88, Chinese nuclear engineer, member of the Chinese Academy of Engineering.
Xu Mi, 85, Chinese nuclear engineer, member of the Chinese Academy of Engineering.

5
Magomed Abdulaev, 61, Russian lawyer and politician, prime minister of Dagestan (2010–2013), traffic collision.
Ruth Adler Schnee, 99, German-born American textile and interior designer.
Gaspar Ariño Ortiz, 86, Spanish lawyer, professor and politician, deputy (1989–1993).
Earl Boen, 81, American actor (The Terminator, Bonkers, World of Warcraft), lung cancer.
Renate Boy, 83, German shot putter, Olympic silver medallist (1964).
Mark Capps, 54, American sound engineer, shot.
Ernesto Castano, 83, Italian footballer (Triestina, Juventus, national team).
Jean Clémentin, 98, French journalist (Le Canard enchaîné), writer, and spy.
Nate Colbert, 76, American baseball player (San Diego Padres, Houston Astros, Detroit Tigers).
Carl Duser, 90, American baseball player (Kansas City Athletics).
Martin Fabi, 80, Canadian football player (Saskatchewan Roughriders, Montreal Alouettes).
Herbert Gintis, 82, American economist, behavioral scientist and author (Schooling in Capitalist America).
Mike Hill, 73, American film editor (Apollo 13, Rush, Frost/Nixon), Oscar winner (1996), cryptogenic organizing pneumonia.
Kim Deok-ju, 89, South Korean lawyer and judge, chief justice (1990–1993).
Mondeño, 88, Spanish torero.
Mahir Muradov, 66, Azerbaijani judge, member of the Constitutional Court (since 2012).
Giorgio Otranto, 82, Italian historian, cerebral hemorrhage.
Russell Pearce, 75, American politician, member (2006–2011) and president (2011) of the Arizona Senate.
Ernesto Alfredo Piñón de la Cruz, 33, Mexican criminal (Los Mexicles), shot.
Albert Rachkov, 95, Russian diplomat and politician, second secretary of the Communist Party of Turkmenistan (1980–1986).
Dave Schubert, 49, American street photographer.
Michael Snow, 94, Canadian filmmaker (Wavelength, Back and Forth) and artist (Flight Stop).
Dušan Veličković, 75–76, Serbian writer, journalist and filmmaker.
Buddhi Wickrama, 83, Sri Lankan actor (Anthima Reya, Water, Lantin Singho).
Quentin Williams, 39, American politician, member of the Connecticut House of Representatives (since 2019), traffic collision.
Yang Fuyu, 95, Chinese biochemist, member of the Chinese Academy of Sciences.

6
Sadiq al-Ahmar, 66, Yemeni politician and tribal leader, MP (1993–2011), cancer.
Benjamin Almoneda, 92, Filipino Roman Catholic prelate, auxiliary bishop (1990–1991) and bishop (1991–2007) of Daet.
Benjamin Bederson, 101, American physicist (Manhattan Project).
Fred Benners, 92, American football player (New York Giants).
Omar Berdiýew, 43, Turkmen footballer (Esil Bogatyr, Dinamo Samarqand, national team).
Bill Campbell, 74, American baseball player (Minnesota Twins, Boston Red Sox, Chicago Cubs), cancer.
Marc-Kanyan Case, 80, French Olympic footballer (1968).
Slaheddine Cherif, 85, Tunisian judge and politician.
Gervasio Gestori, 86, Italian Roman Catholic prelate, bishop of San Benedetto del Tronto-Ripatransone-Montalto (1996–2013).
Jacques Grattarola, 92, French footballer (Cannes, Saint-Étienne).
Ernst Grissemann, 88, Austrian radio host.
Peter Hoffmann, 92, German-Canadian historian.
Sir Patrick Hogan, 83, New Zealand Hall of Fame racehorse breeder.
Lew Hunter, 87, American screenwriter and screenwriting teacher, COVID-19.
John Warren Johnson, 93, American businessman and politician, member of the Minnesota House of Representatives (1966–1974).
Danny Kaleikini, 85, American Hawaiian entertainer and singer.
David S. Laustsen, 75, American politician, member of the South Dakota House of Representatives (1977–1984) and senate (1985–1987).
Vincent Lindo, 86, Jamaican cricketer (Nottinghamshire, Somerset).
Annette McCarthy, 64, American actress (Twin Peaks, Creature, Baywatch).
Stuart McCutcheon, 68, New Zealand academic administrator, vice-chancellor of the University of Auckland (2005–2020) and Victoria University of Wellington (2000–2004).
Frank Molden, 80, American football player (Los Angeles Rams, Philadelphia Eagles, New York Giants).
Carlos Monín, 83, Paraguayan football player (Toulouse, Red Star, national team) and manager.
Theodore R. Newman Jr., 88, American jurist, judge (1976–2016) and chief judge (1976–1984) of the D.C. Court of Appeals, judge of the Superior Court of D.C. (1970–1976).
Nguyễn Thọ Chân, 100, Vietnamese politician, minister of labor (1974–1981).
Sigifredo Ochoa, 80, Salvadoran military officer and politician, deputy (2012–2015), traffic collision.
David Penington, 92, Australian physician and academic administrator, vice-chancellor of the University of Melbourne (1988–1995).
Karl Pfeifer, 94, Austrian journalist (Jungle World).
Paula Quintana, 66, Chilean sociologist and politician.
Owen Roizman, 86, American cinematographer (The Exorcist, Network, The French Connection).
Renzo Sacco, 78, Italian politician, president of the Province of Padua (1995–1998).
Dick Savitt, 95, American Hall of Fame tennis player.
Shen Lyu-shun, 73, Taiwanese diplomat, representative to the United States (2014–2016) and the United Kingdom (2011–2014).
Victoria de Stefano, 82, Italian-Venezuelan novelist.
Axel Troost, 68, German politician, MP (2005–2017, 2021).
Gianluca Vialli, 58, Italian football player (Juventus, national team) and manager (Chelsea), pancreatic cancer.

7
Russell Banks, 82, American novelist (Continental Drift, The Sweet Hereafter, Cloudsplitter), cancer.
Toni Batllori, 71–72, Spanish cartoonist.
Miroslav Celler, 31, Slovak squash player, fall.
Djão, 64, Mozambican-born Portuguese footballer (Belenenses, Penafiel, national team).
Marcelle Engelen Faber, 99, French resistance fighter.
Joseph A. Hardy III, 100, American lumber industry executive, founder of 84 Lumber.
Mary Ellen Hawkins, 99, American politician, member of the Florida House of Representatives (1974–1994).
Rob Heming, 90, Australian rugby union player (New South Wales, national team).
Henri Heurtebise, 86, French poet and editor.
Mohammad Hosseini, 39, Iranian dissident, execution by hanging.
Walter Intemann, 78, Swiss-born Austrian businessman and politician.
Nazrul Islam, 73, Indian politician, Assam MLA (1996–2021).
Mohammad Mehdi Karami, 22, Iranian dissident, execution by hanging.
Aleksandr Kharchikov, 73, Russian folk singer-songwriter.
William S. W. Lim, 90, Singaporean architect (Marine Parade Community Building, People's Park Complex, Golden Mile Complex).
Modeste M'bami, 40, Cameroonian footballer (Sedan, PSG, national team), Olympic champion (2000), heart attack.
Yuri Manin, 85, Russian mathematician (Gauss–Manin connection).
Zinaid Memišević, 72, Bosnian-Serbian actor (2012, Miracle, Bolji život).
Sinikiwe Mpofu, 37, Zimbabwean cricket player (national team) and coach (Southerns).
Philemon Mulala, 59–60, Zambian footballer (Mufulira Wanderers, Cape Town Spurs, national team), injuries sustained from dog attack.
Tony Pantano, 74, Italian-born Australian singer and entertainer, cancer.
Naomi Replansky, 104, American poet.
Adam Rich, 54, American actor (Eight Is Enough, Dungeons & Dragons, The Devil and Max Devlin).
Karl Schüßler, 98, German Olympic cross-country skier (1952).
Ken Scotland, 86, Scottish rugby union player (Leicester Tigers, national team) and cricketer (national team), cancer.
Dorothy Tristan, 88, American actress (Klute, Scarecrow) and screenwriter (Weeds), complications from Alzheimer's disease.
Tehemton Erach Udwadia, 88, Indian surgeon and gastroenterologist.

8
Charles David Allis, 71, American molecular biologist, cancer.
Gundars Bērziņš, 63, Latvian accountant and politician, minister of finance (2000–2002) and deputy (since 1993).
Sietse Bosgra, 87, Dutch political activist.
Arnie Coro, 80, Cuban radio presenter, co-founder of Radio Havana Cuba.
Borislav Dević, 59, Serbian Olympic marathoner (1996).
Roberto Dinamite, 68, Brazilian footballer (Vasco da Gama, national team) and politician, deputy (1995–2015), colon cancer.
Willem Doise, 87, Belgian academic and psychologist.
Mduduzi Fuzwayo, 36, Zimbabwean cricketer (Matabeleland Tuskers), traffic collision.
Juan Francisco García, 69, Mexican Olympic boxer (1972).
Patrick Grimlund, 50, Swedish television presenter, traffic collision.
Georgina Hammick, 83, English author.
Lynnette Hardaway, 51, American conservative activist (Diamond and Silk), heart disease.
Jack W. Hayford, 88, American Pentecostal minister and hymn writer, founder of The King's University.
Bernard Kalb, 100, American journalist (Reliable Sources, The New York Times), assistant secretary of state for public affairs (1985–1986), complications from a fall.
Siegfried Kurz, 92, German conductor and composer.
Michel Laurencin, 78, French academic and historian.
Barry Lines, 80, English footballer (Northampton Town).
Harold Martens, 81, Canadian rancher and politician, Saskatchewan MLA (1982–1995).
Ray Middleton, 86, British Olympic racewalker (1964), respiratory failure.
Slim Newton, 90, Australian country music singer-songwriter (The Redback on the Toilet Seat).
Christiane Papon, 98, French politician, MEP (1987–1989) and deputy (1988–1993).
Luis Gabriel Ramírez Díaz, 57, Colombian Roman Catholic prelate, bishop of El Banco (2014–2021) and Ocaña (since 2021).
Aleksandr Shabanov, 87, Russian chemist and politician, deputy (1995–2003).
Georgy Shayduko, 60, Russian sailor, Olympic silver medallist (1996), cardiac arrest.
Aleksey Slapovsky, 65, Russian novelist, playwright and screenwriter (The Irony of Fate 2), pneumonia.
Walter Tosta, 66, Brazilian politician, deputy (2011–2015).
Keshari Nath Tripathi, 88, Indian politician, Uttar Pradesh MLA (1977–1980, 1989–2007), governor of West Bengal (2014–2019) and twice of Bihar.
Adriaan Vlok, 85, South African politician, minister of correctional services (1991–1994).
C. Anne Wilson, 95, British food historian.
Wu Tao, 82, Chinese diplomat, ambassador to Portugal (1992–1994), Russia (1998–2001) and Australia (2001–2003), COVID-19.

9
Peace Anyiam-Osigwe, 53, Nigerian filmmaker and entertainment executive.
Ali Reza Ashrafi, 58–59, Iranian mathematician, traffic collision.
Yahya Baş, 71, Turkish politician, MP (2002–2007) and mayor of Güngören (1992–2002).
Séamus Begley, 73, Irish musician.
Hermann-Josef Blanke, 65, German academic and legal scholar.
Les Brown Jr., 82, American musician, actor and producer, cancer.
Stefan Brzózka, 91, Polish chess player.
Max Chantal, 64, French rugby league player (Villeneuve XIII, national team).
William Consovoy, 48, American attorney, brain cancer.
Melinda Dillon, 83, American actress (Close Encounters of the Third Kind, Absence of Malice, A Christmas Story).
David Duckham, 76, English rugby union player (Coventry, national team).
Ahmaad Galloway, 42, American football player (Denver Broncos, San Diego Chargers, Frankfurt Galaxy).
Adolfo Kaminsky, 97, Argentine-born French forger and resistant.
Yoshito Kishi, 85, Japanese chemist (Nozaki–Hiyama–Kishi reaction), stroke.
Simone Kramer, 83, Dutch author.
Thomas Kretschmer, 68, German politician, member of the Landtag of Thuringia (1990–2008).
Hans Krieger, 89, German journalist, essayist and poet.
Magnar Mangersnes, 84, Norwegian organist and choral conductor.
Yoriaki Matsudaira, 91, Japanese composer, pneumonia.
Raymond Mertens, 89, Belgian football player (Royal Uccle Sport) and coach.
Ferenc Mészáros, 72, Hungarian footballer (Vasas SC, Vitória de Setúbal, national team).
Lesego Motsumi, 58, Botswana politician, fire.
K. Alex Müller, 95, Swiss physicist, Nobel Prize laureate (1987).
Timothy Nga, 49, Singaporean actor (First Class).
Gerry O'Hara, 98, British film and television director (That Kind of Girl, The Bitch, The Professionals).
Virginia Kraft Payson, 92, American thoroughbred horse breeder and sports journalist (Sports Illustrated), complications from Parkinson's disease.
Cincy Powell, 80, American basketball player (Dallas Chaparrals, Kentucky Colonels, Virginia Squires).
Rehman Rahi, 97, Indian poet.
Mikio Sato, 94, Japanese mathematician (Sato–Tate conjecture, Sato–Bernstein polynomial).
Tim Schadla-Hall, 75, British archaeologist.
Charles Simic, 84, Serbian-born American poet, complications from dementia.
Rainer Ulrich, 73, German football player (Karlsruher SC) and coach (SSV Ulm, VfR Mannheim).
Norma Whiteman, 95, Australian cricketer (New South Wales, national team).
Zhang Jinlin, 86, Chinese engineer, member of the Chinese Academy of Engineering.
George S. Zimbel, 93, American-Canadian documentary photographer.

10
Sara Aboobacker, 86, Indian writer and translator.
Jorge Ballesteros, 39, Spanish sports shooter, shot.
Jeff Beck, 78, British Hall of Fame guitarist (The Yardbirds, The Jeff Beck Group), six-time Grammy winner, bacterial meningitis.
Hans Belting, 87, German art historian.
Gaudenzio Bernasconi, 90, Italian footballer (Atalanta, Sampdoria, national team).
Black Warrior, 54, Mexican professional wrestler (CMLL).
Gregory Blackstock, 77, American artist.
Donald Blom, 73, American murderer.
Lothar Blumhagen, 95, German film (Sommerliebe) and voice actor.
Dennis Budimir, 84, American jazz and rock guitarist (The Wrecking Crew).
Jorge O. Calvo, 61, Argentine geologist and paleontologist.
Hermenegildo Candeias, 88, Portuguese Olympic gymnast (1960).
Constantine II, 82, Greek monarch and sailor, king (1964–1973) and Olympic champion (1960), stroke.
Alain da Costa, 87, Gabonese football manager (USM Libreville, Vantour Mangoungou, national team).
István Deák, 96, Hungarian-born American historian, member of the Hungarian Academy of Sciences.
Pierre Dorsini, 88, French footballer (Toulouse, Nancy).
Kalle Eller, 82, Estonian publisher, cultural researcher and poet.
José Evangelista, 79, Spanish composer.
Jean Gevenois, 91, Belgian politician, senator (1983–1996).
Jeff Hamilton, 56, American Olympic skier, pancreatic cancer.
He Ping, 65, Chinese film director (Swordsmen in Double Flag Town, Sun Valley, Warriors of Heaven and Earth), heart attack.
Traudl Hecher, 79, Austrian ski racer, Olympic bronze medallist (1960, 1964).
Kevin Higgins, 55–56, Irish poet, leukaemia.
Blake Hounshell, 44, American journalist (The New York Times, Politico, Foreign Policy), suicide.
Irenaios, 83, Greek Orthodox prelate, patriarch of the Greek Orthodox Church of Jerusalem (2001–2005).
Majid Jahangir, 74, Pakistani comedian (Fifty Fifty).
Jean Leccia, 84, French composer, conductor, and pianist.
Sezi Mbaguta, 76, Ugandan politician, MP (2011–2016).
Bruce Murray, 82, New Zealand cricketer (Wellington, national team).
Tyre Nichols, 29, American motorist, subject of Tyre Nichols protests.
George Pell, 81, Australian Roman Catholic cardinal, archbishop of Melbourne (1996–2001) and Sydney (2001–2014), prefect of the Secretariat for the Economy (2014–2019), complications from hip surgery.
Roy Schwitters, 78, American physicist, cancer.
Christopher T. Walsh, 78, American biochemist, member of the National Academy of Sciences, fall.

11
Eduardo Amorós, 79, Spanish Olympic equestrian (1976).
Shimon Baadani, 94, Israeli Orthodox rabbi, pneumonia.
Francis L. Bodine, 87, American politician, member of the New Jersey General Assembly (1994–2008).
Peter Campbell, 62, American water polo player, twice Olympic silver medallist (1984, 1988).
Carole Cook, 98, American actress (The Lucy Show, The Incredible Mr. Limpet, Sixteen Candles), heart failure.
Günther Deschner, 81, German author and historian.
Piers Haggard, 83, British director (Pennies From Heaven).
Harriet Hall, 77, American Air Force flight surgeon.
Enamul Haque, 83, Bangladeshi politician, MP (1986–1988).
Hussein el-Husseini, 85, Lebanese politician, speaker of the parliament (1984–1992).
Charles Kimbrough, 86, American actor (Murphy Brown, The Hunchback of Notre Dame, The Wedding Planner).
Doming Lam, 96, Macanese-born Hong Kong classical composer.
Ben Masters, 75, American actor (Passions, All That Jazz, HeartBeat), COVID-19.
Antonio Muratore, 95, Italian politician, senator (1983–1994).
Pavlo Naumenko, 57, Ukrainian aerospace engineer.
Rafiq Nishonov, 96, Uzbek politician, chairman of the Soviet Nationalities (1989–1991) and first secretary of the Communist Party (1988–1989).
Eli Ostreicher, 39, British-born American serial entrepreneur, traffic collision.
Tatjana Patitz, 56, German model and actress (Rising Sun), breast cancer.
Murtaza Rakhimov, 88, Russian politician, president of Bashkortostan (1993–2010).
François Roussely, 78, French government official and magistrate, president of Électricité de France (1998–2004).
Christian Sauvé, 79, French painter.
Kamel Tahir, 78, Algerian footballer (USM Alger, JS Kabylie, national team).
Yukihiro Takahashi, 70, Japanese drummer and singer (Yellow Magic Orchestra, Sadistic Mika Band, METAFIVE), pneumonia.
Charles White, 64, American football player (Cleveland Browns, Los Angeles Rams), Heisman Trophy winner (1979), liver cancer.

12
Robbie Bachman, 69, Canadian drummer (Bachman–Turner Overdrive).
Els Bendheim, 99, Dutch-Israeli theologian and philanthropist.
Harold Brown, 98, American Air Force officer (Tuskegee Airmen).
Mike Cardinal, 81, Canadian politician, Alberta MLA (1989–2008).
Sanjay Chauhan, 60, Indian screenwriter (I Am Kalam, Paan Singh Tomar, Saheb, Biwi Aur Gangster Returns), liver disease.
Gerrie Coetzee, 67, South African boxer, WBA heavyweight champion (1983–1984), lung cancer. 
Bob Cunnell, 80, English cricketer (Suffolk), pneumonia.
Henri De Wolf, 86, Belgian racing cyclist.
David Doctorian, 88, American politician, member of the Missouri Senate (1977–1991).
Vittorio Garatti, 95, Italian architect.
Frene Ginwala, 90, South African politician and academic administrator, speaker of the National Assembly (1994–2004), chancellor of the UKZN (2005–2007), complications from a stroke.
Toos Grol-Overling, 91, Dutch teacher and politician, senator (1982–1999).
Mozammel Haque, 67, Bangladeshi politician, MP (2001–2006).
Delwar Hossain, 67, Bangladeshi politician, MP (2001–2006), kidney disease.
Paul Johnson, 94, British journalist and historian (Modern Times: A History of the World from the 1920s to the 1980s, A History of the American People, A History of Christianity).
Otohiko Kaga, 93, Japanese author.
Elka Konstantinova, 90, Bulgarian literary critic and politician, MP (1991–1994), minister of culture (1991–1992).
Jean Laurent, 78, French banker and businessman, managing director of Crédit Agricole (1999–2005).
Valentyna Lutayeva, 66, Ukrainian handball player, Olympic champion (1980).
Sulambek Mamilov, 84, Russian film director (Ladies' Tango, Day of Wrath, The Murder at Zhdanovskaya).
Roy Pierpoint, 93, British racing driver, saloon car champion (1965).
Lisa Marie Presley, 54, American singer-songwriter ("Lights Out", "You Ain't Seen Nothin' Yet"), cardiac arrest.
Daniel Richard, 78, French entrepreneur.
Sidharth Sharma, 28, Indian cricketer (Himachal Pradesh).
Bruce Sharp, 91, Australian Olympic gymnast (1956).
Carl-Gustaf Styrenius, 93, Swedish classical archaeologist.
Lee Tinsley, 53, American baseball player (Boston Red Sox, Seattle Mariners, Philadelphia Phillies).
Charles Treger, 87, American violinist.
Brian Tufano, 83, English cinematographer (Trainspotting, Billy Elliot, Shallow Grave).
Charlotte Vale-Allen, 81, Canadian-born American contemporary fiction writer.
Elliot Valenstein, 99, American neuroscientist and psychologist.
Bobby Wood, 87, American politician, member of the Tennessee House of Representatives (1976–2004).
Sharad Yadav, 75, Indian politician, MP (1974–1980, 1986–2017), minister of consumer affairs, food and public distribution (2002–2004).

13
Madeleine Attal, 101, French actress and theatre director.
Odd Bergh, 85, Norwegian athlete.
Sir Alan Budd, 85, British economist, chairman of the Office for Budget Responsibility (2010), heart attack.
Reginald Cooray, 75, Sri Lankan politician, three-time MP, chief minister of Western Province (2000–2009) and governor of Northern Province (2016–2018), heart attack.
Ray Cordeiro, 98, Hong Kong disc jockey (RTHK Radio 3) and actor (Games Gamblers Play, Security Unlimited).
Country Boy Eddie, 92, American country musician and television host.
Bill Davis, 80, American baseball player (Cleveland Indians, San Diego Padres).
Peter W. Hutchins, 77–78, Canadian legal scholar.
Kai Kalima, 77, Finnish lawyer and politician, MP (1989–1991).
Robbie Knievel, 60, American daredevil and stuntman, pancreatic cancer.
Klas Lestander, 91, Swedish biathlete, Olympic champion (1960). 
Mao Zhi, 90, Chinese engineer, member of the Chinese Academy of Engineering.
Laila Mikkelsen, 82, Norwegian film director (Little Ida, Oss) and producer (Nedtur).
James L. Morse, 82, American jurist, justice of the Vermont Supreme Court (1988–2003).
Fañch Peru, 82, French teacher, writer and politician, mayor of Berhet (1983–2001).
Zenon Pigoń, 82, Polish trade unionist and politician, MP (1989–1991).
Enaxon Siddiqova, 68, Uzbek poet and politician, senator (since 2015).
Claudio Willer, 82, Brazilian poet and translator, bladder cancer.
Thomasina Winslow, 57, American blues musician, stroke.
Marc Worth, 61, British fashion executive, co-founder of WGSN, heart attack.
Yoshio Yoda, 88, Japanese-born American actor (McHale's Navy, The Horizontal Lieutenant).

14
Alireza Akbari, 61, Iranian-British politician and convicted spy, execution by hanging. (death announced on this date)
Brenda Almond, 85, British philosopher.
Les Barker, 75, English poet.
Gianfranco Baruchello, 98, Italian painter.
Ronald Blythe, 100, English writer and columnist (Church Times).
Wally Campo, 99, American actor (Machine-Gun Kelly, The Little Shop of Horrors, Master of the World).
Matthias Carras, 58, German pop singer, cancer.
Zdeněk Češka, 93, Czech lawyer, academic and politician.
Santokh Singh Chaudhary, 76, Indian politician, MP (since 2014), heart attack.
Inna Churikova, 79, Russian actress (Jack Frost, The Very Same Munchhausen, Walking the Streets of Moscow).
Bernard Delemotte, 83, French diver and cameraman.
Sunder Lal Dixit, 80, Indian politician, three-time Uttar Pradesh MLA, fall.
Georgy Gagloev, 25, Russian mixed martial artist, strangled.
Ruby Ghaznavi, 88, Bangladeshi businesswoman and activist.
Carl Hahn, 96, German automotive industry executive, chairman of Volkswagen Group (1982–1993).
Craig Lowe, 65, American politician, mayor of Gainesville (2010–2013).
Poul-Erik Nielsen, 91, Danish badminton player.
Femi Ogunrombi, Nigerian actor and ethnomusicologist.
David Onley, 72, Canadian journalist, writer and politician, lieutenant governor of Ontario (2007–2014).
Qian Yitai, 82, Chinese chemist, member of the Chinese Academy of Sciences.
Mansa Ram, 82, Indian politician, Himachal Pradesh MLA (1967–1977, 1982–1985, 1998–2003), kidney failure.
Trifonio Salazar, 74, Filipino military officer.
Hermann A. Schlögl, 85, German actor and Egyptologist.
Miyuki Ueta, 49, Japanese murderer, asphyxiation.
Lieuwe Westra, 40, Dutch Olympic cyclist (2012).
John Wickham, 73, British motor racing team owner (Spirit Racing).

15
Alexis Arette, 95, French farmer, writer, and politician, member of the Regional Council of Aquitaine (1986–1998).
Leonid Barbier, 85, Ukrainian Olympic swimmer (1960).
Ed Beard, 83, American football player (San Francisco 49ers), complications from Alzheimer's disease.
Jane Cederqvist, 77, Swedish swimmer, Olympic silver medallist (1960), complications from amyotrophic lateral sclerosis.
Chen Qizhi, 97, Chinese military officer and academic administrator, deputy (1975–1983) and president of NUDT (1990–1994).
Victoria Chick, 86, American economist.
Noël Coulet, 90, French academic and historian.
Doris, 75, Swedish pop singer.
Bruce Gowers, 82, British television and music video director ("Bohemian Rhapsody", "Stayin' Alive", "1999"), Emmy winner (2009).
C. J. Harris, 31, American singer (American Idol), heart attack.
Piet van Heusden, 93, Dutch track cyclist.
Mukarram Jah, 89, Indian royal, titular Nizam of Hyderabad (since 1967).
Sven Johansson, 94, Swedish politician, governor of Västerbotten County (1978–1991).
Andrew Jones, 39, Welsh film director and screenwriter (The Amityville Asylum, Robert, Werewolves of the Third Reich).
Vakhtang Kikabidze, 84, Georgian singer, actor (Mimino, Don't Grieve) and politician, MP (since 2020), brain cancer.
Jan Krol, 60, Dutch actor.
Gordana Kuić, 80, Serbian novelist (The Scent of Rain in the Balkans).
George McLeod, 92, American basketball player (Baltimore Bullets).
Lloyd Morrisett, 93, American psychologist and television producer (Sesame Street).
Mursal Nabizada, 32, Afghan politician, member of the National Assembly (2019–2021), shot.
Shaye Al-Nafisah, 60, Saudi Arabian footballer (Al-Kawab, national team).
Gino Odjick, 52, Canadian ice hockey player (Vancouver Canucks, New York Islanders, Montreal Canadiens), heart attack.
Ruslan Otverchenko, 33, Ukrainian basketball player (BC Budivelnyk, SC Prometey, national team), heart disease. 
Guadalupe Rivera Marín, 98, Mexican lawyer and politician, deputy (1961–1964, 1979–1982) and senator (1984–1988).
Dilip Sardjoe, 73, Surinamese businessman and politician.
Ted Savage, 85, American baseball player (St. Louis Cardinals, Chicago Cubs, Los Angeles Dodgers). 
Gáspár Miklós Tamás, 74, Hungarian columnist (openDemocracy) and politician, MP (1989–1994).
Jean Veloz, 98, American dancer and actress (Swing Fever, Where Are Your Children?, Jive Junction).
Yoshimitsu Yamada, 84, Japanese aikido practitioner.

16
Carrie Acheson, 88, Irish politician, TD (1981–1982).
Latif Afridi, 79, Pakistani lawyer and politician, president of the Supreme Court Bar Association (2020–2021) and MNA (1997–1999), shot.
John Bicourt, 77, British Olympic middle-distance runner (1972, 1976).
Manfred Böcker, 82, German politician, member of the Landtag of North Rhine-Westphalia (1980–2005).
Mousse Boulanger, 96, Swiss writer and journalist.
Ann Thomas Callahan, 87, Canadian Cree nurse.
Vladas Česiūnas, 82, Lithuanian sprint canoeist, Olympic champion (1972).
Jean-Claude Coquet, 94, French linguist and semiotician.
Tom Corcoran, 79, American novelist and photographer, cancer.
Pierre Danos, 93, French rugby union player (RC Toulon, AS Béziers Hérault, national team). 
Mansour el-Essawy, 85, Egyptian politician, minister of interior (2011).
Alan Glass, 90, Canadian artist.
Guo Hong'an, 79, Chinese translator.
Bjarne Hansen, 93, Norwegian footballer (Vålerenga, national team).
Luisa Josefina Hernández, 94, Mexican writer, playwright and translator.
Jann Hoffmann, 65, Danish darts player.
Gina Lollobrigida, 95, Italian actress (Bread, Love and Dreams, Come September, The Hunchback of Notre Dame).
Giorgio Mariuzzo, 83, Italian screenwriter (The House by the Cemetery, The Beyond) and director (Apache Woman).
Jim Molan, 72, Australian general and politician, senator (2017–2019, since 2019), cancer.
Mats Nordberg, 64, Swedish politician, MP (since 2018).
Brian Perry, 78, British-born Canadian ice hockey player (Oakland Seals, New York Islanders, Buffalo Sabres).
Johnny Powers, 84, American rockabilly singer and guitarist.
Arthur Ravenel Jr., 95, American politician, member of the South Carolina House of Representatives (1953–1959) and twice of the Senate, member of the U.S. House of Representatives (1987–1995).
Lupe Serrano, 92, Chilean-born American ballerina, complications from Alzheimer's disease.
Rasul Siddik, 73, American jazz trumpeter.
Gary Smith, 64, American record producer, cancer.
Jean-Pierre Swings, 79, American-born Belgian astronomer.
Frank Thomas, 93, American baseball player (Pittsburgh Pirates, New York Mets, Chicago Cubs).

17
Jay Briscoe, 38, American professional wrestler (ROH, CZW, NJPW), traffic collision.
John Bura, 78, American Ukrainian Greek Catholic hierarch, auxiliary bishop of Philadelphia (2006–2019).
Van Conner, 55, American bass guitarist (Screaming Trees), pneumonia.
Teodor Corban, 65, Romanian actor (12:08 East of Bucharest, 4 Months, 3 Weeks and 2 Days, Tales from the Golden Age).
Jerome R. Cox Jr., 97, American computer pioneer, scientist and entrepreneur.
Manana Doijashvili, 75, Georgian pianist.
Leon Dubinsky, 81, Canadian actor (Life Classes, Pit Pony), theatre director and composer ("Rise Again").
Maria Dworzecka, 81, Polish-American physicist and Holocaust survivor.
George Ellis, 90, English athlete.
Chris Ford, 74, American basketball player and coach (Detroit Pistons, Boston Celtics), NBA champion (1981, 1984, 1986).
Renée Geyer, 69, Australian singer ("Say I Love You", "Heading in the Right Direction", "Stares and Whispers"), complications from hip surgery.
William Thomas Hart, 93, American jurist, judge of the U.S. District Court for Northern Illinois (since 1982).
Heinz-Dieter Hasebrink, 81, German footballer (Rot-Weiss Essen, 1. FC Kaiserslautern, Werder Bremen).
Badara Joof, 65, Gambian politician, vice-president (since 2022).
Mamoru Kobayashi, 78, Japanese politician, MP (1990–2003).
Gino Landi, 89, Italian choreographer and television and theatre director.
Liang Jincai, 95, Chinese aerospace engineer, member of the Chinese Academy of Engineering.
Joe Martin, 91, Irish footballer (Dundalk).
Jean-Claude Marty, 79, French rugby league player (FC Lézignan XIII, Racing Club Albi XIII, national team).
Nicola Molè, 91, Italian lawyer and politician, president of the Province of Terni (1995–1999).
Namiq Nasrullayev, 77, Azerbaijani politician, minister of economy (1996–2001), chairman of the Chamber of Accounts (2001–2007).
Richard Oesterreicher, 90, Austrian guitarist and conductor.
Arjan Paans, 53, Dutch journalist, cancer.
Muhammad Prakosa, 62, Indonesian bureaucrat, diplomat, and politician, MP (2009–2021).
Edward R. Pressman, 79, American film producer (Wall Street, Conan the Barbarian, Badlands).
Jonathan Raban, 80, British travel writer, critic, and novelist (Soft City, Waxwings, For Love & Money).
Josep Rahola i d'Espona, 104, Spanish engineer and politician, senator (1979–1986).
Lucile Randon, 118, French supercentenarian, world's oldest living person (since 2022).
Cornelius Rogge, 90, Dutch artist.
Vladimir Rusalov, 83, Russian psychologist and anthropologist.
Rickin Sánchez, Puerto Rican wrestling, boxing and baseball television broadcaster.
Sandra Seacat, 86, American acting coach (Andrew Garfield, Laura Dern) and actress (Under the Banner of Heaven).
Robert Simmonds, 96, Canadian police officer, commissioner of the Royal Canadian Mounted Police (1977–1987).
Paul Soulikias, 96, Greek-Canadian painter, pneumonia.
Lewis Stevens, 86, British politician, MP (1983–1992).
Stanislav Tereba, 85, Czech photojournalist.
Ferenc Varga, 97, Hungarian sprint canoer, Olympic bronze medallist (1952).
Sir Samuel Whitbread, 85, British businessman and public servant.
Nicola Zamboni, 79, Italian sculptor.
Martinez Zogo, 51, Cameroonian journalist.

18
Catalino Arevalo, 97, Filipino priest and theologian.
Henry Caicedo, 71, Colombian footballer (Independiente Medellín, Deportivo Cali, national team), complications from a stroke.
Donn Cambern, 93, American film editor (Easy Rider, Romancing the Stone, Ghostbusters II), complications from a fall.
Per Christiansson, 61, Swedish Olympic cyclist (1984), cancer.
Herman Coessens, 79, Belgian actor (Ons geluk).
David Crosby, 81, American Hall of Fame singer (The Byrds, Crosby, Stills, Nash & Young) and songwriter ("Guinnevere"), complications from COVID-19.
William Frank, 99, Canadian politician, MP (1972–1974).
Clytus Gottwald, 97, German composer, conductor and musicologist.
Robert Hersh, 82, American lawyer.
Jacques Jarry, 93, French linguist and archeologist.
Valiulla Maksutov, 68, Russian politician, senator (1996).
John L. Murray, 79, Irish jurist, chief justice (2004–2011), judge of the Supreme Court (1999–2015) and the European Court of Justice (1992–1999).
Melitta Muszely, 95, Austrian operatic soprano and voice teacher.
Jagdish Nehra, 79, Indian politician, Haryana MLA (1982–1987).
Roslyn Pope, 84, American civil rights activist and writer (An Appeal for Human Rights).
Leopold Potesil, 89, Austrian Olympic boxer (1952, 1956).
Eileen Ramsay, 82, British author, pneumonia.
Victor Rasgado, 63, Mexican pianist and composer.
Bill Relph, 94, Scottish rugby union player (Edinburgh District, national team).
Ted Schwarzman, 76, Australian footballer (St Kilda).
Prabhaben Shah, 92, Indian social worker, heart disease.
Zigi Shipper, 93, Polish Holocaust survivor. 
Paul Vecchiali, 92, French film director (At the Top of the Stairs, Rosa la rose, fille publique, Once More) and author.
Marcel Zanini, 99, Turkish-born French jazz musician.
Hakim Zaripov, 98, Uzbek circus performer, trick rider and horse trainer.
Marius Zibolis, 48, Lithuanian goalball player, Paralympic silver medallist (2000, 2008).
Notable Ukrainians killed in the 2023 Brovary helicopter crash:
Yurii Lubkovych, 33, diplomat
Denys Monastyrsky, 42, politician, minister of internal affairs (since 2021) and MP (2019–2021)
Yevhen Yenin, 42, politician, deputy minister of internal affairs (since 2021)

19
Abdul Ghani Azhari, 101, Indian Islamic scholar.
Gilles Beyer, 66, French figure skater and skating coach.
Jim Bradbury, 85, British historian.
Bertie Cunningham, 81, Irish Gaelic footballer (Meath).
Kuldip Singh Dhillon, 72, Indian-British property developer and polo player.
Carin Goldberg, 69, American graphic designer.
Claude Guillon, 70, French writer and philosopher.
Nadir Latif İslam, 92–93, Turkish lawyer and politician, MP (1973–1977).
Walter Antonio Jiménez, 83, Argentine footballer (Independiente, Colo-Colo, national team).
Isuf Kalo, 80, Albanian physician.
Jean-Claude Lemagny, 91, French library curator and photography historian. 
Imre Mécs, 89, Hungarian politician, MP (1990–2010).
Oladipo Ogunlesi, 99, Nigerian professor of medicine.
Bert Peña, 63, Puerto Rican baseball player (Houston Astros), esophageal cancer.
Sumitra Peries, 88, Sri Lankan film director (Gehenu Lamai, Ganga Addara, Yahaluvo).
Nilmani Phookan Jr, 89, Indian poet.
Andrey Popov, 59, Russian politician, MP (1993–1995).
Andi Rasdiyanah Amir, 87, Indonesian scholar, rector of the Alauddin Islamic State Institute (1985–1994).
George Rose, 81, American football player (Minnesota Vikings, New Orleans Saints).
Norbert Sattler, 71, Austrian slalom canoeist, Olympic silver medallist (1972).
Volodymyr Shcherbyna, 87, Ukrainian mathematician and politician, people's deputy (1990–1994).
Ginger Stanley, 91, American model, actress and stunt woman (Creature from the Black Lagoon, Jupiter's Darling, Revenge of the Creature).
Betty Lee Sung, 98, American activist, author and academic.
David Sutherland, 89, Scottish illustrator and comics artist (The Beano, Dennis the Menace and Gnasher, The Bash Street Kids).
Peter Thomas, 78, English-Irish footballer (Waterford, Ireland national team).
Jos Van Riel, 79, Belgian footballer (Antwerp).
Anton Walkes, 25, English footballer (Portsmouth, Atlanta United, Charlotte FC), boat collision.
Yoon Jeong-hee, 78, South Korean actress (Poetry, The Three-Day Reign, Oyster Village), complications from Alzheimer's disease.

20
Xavier Albó, 88, Spanish Jesuit priest, linguist and anthropologist.
Sal Bando, 78, American Hall of Fame baseball player (Arizona State Sun Devils, Kansas City/Oakland Athletics, Milwaukee Brewers), World Series champion (1972, 1973, 1974), cancer.
Tim Barlow, 87, English actor (Derek, Les Misérables, Hot Fuzz).
Ted Bell, 76, American novelist, intracerebral hemorrhage.
Tom Birmingham, 73, American politician, member (1991–2002) and president (1996–2002) of the Massachusetts Senate.
Jerry Blavat, 82, American DJ and radio presenter, complications from myasthenia gravis.
Stella Chiweshe, 76, Zimbabwean mbira player.
Albin Eser, 87, German jurist and judge at the International Criminal Tribunal for the former Yugoslavia.
Fang Zhiyuan, 83, Chinese engineer, member of the Chinese Academy of Engineering.
Olivia Geerolf, 72, Belgian choreographer.
Julien Goekint, 93, Belgian politician, mayor of Ostend (1980–1997).
Loïc Guguen, 50, French dramatic baritone.
Harunata, 69, Indonesian bureaucrat and politician.
He Haoju, 100, Chinese politician, deputy (1983–1998).
Pierce Higgins, 45, Irish hurler (Tooreen, Ballyhaunis, Mayo county), complications from motor neurone disease.
Grigorijus Kanovičius, 93, Lithuanian writer.
Hans Kasper, 84, German politician, member of the Landtag of Saarland (1970–1999).
Gwen Knapp, 61, American sports journalist (The Philadelphia Inquirer, San Francisco Chronicle, The New York Times), lymphoma.
Paul LaFarge, 52, American novelist, essayist and academic, cancer.
Chris Leitch, 69, New Zealand politician, cancer.
Jiří Macháně, 82, Czech cinematographer (Beauty and the Beast, The Ninth Heart, Černí baroni).
Michael Moussa Adamo, 62, Gabonese politician, minister of foreign affairs (since 2022), heart attack.
Marvin Nash, 69, Jamaican-born Canadian Olympic sprinter (1976).
Michaela Paetsch, 61, American violinist, cancer.
Oleh Petrov, 62, Ukrainian politician, MP (1998–2006).
Nano Riantiarno, 73, Indonesian playwright.
Taufikurrahman Saleh, 73, Indonesian politician, member of the People's Representative Council (1999–2009).
Richard Steadman, 85, American surgeon.
Howard M. Tesher, 90, American Thoroughbred horse racing trainer.
Tom Villa, 77, American politician, member of the Missouri House of Representatives (1974–1984, 2000–2008).

21
Erricos Andreou, 84, Greek film director (The Hook, Act of Reprisal) and screenwriter.
Gaetano Azzolina, 91, Italian doctor and politician, deputy (1990–1992).
B.G., the Prince of Rap, 57, American rapper and Eurodance artist ("The Colour of My Dreams", "Can We Get Enough?"). 
Georges Banu, 79, Romanian-born French writer.
Ritt Bjerregaard, 81, Danish politician, lord mayor of Copenhagen (2006–2009) and minister of education (1973, 1975–1979).
Gabriel Dodo Ndoke, 51, Cameroonian politician.
Simon Dunn, 35, Australian bobsledder and amateur rugby player.
David Howard, 104, Canadian Olympic sailor (1956).
Linda Kasabian, 73, American cult member (Manson Family).
Inge Kaul, 78, German economist.
Vuyokazi Ketabahle, 49, South African politician, member of the National Assembly of South Africa (2015–2018), stroke.
René Laurin, 82, Canadian politician, MP (1993–2000).
Micheál MacGréil, 91, Irish Jesuit priest, sociologist and author.
Thulani Maseko, 52, Swazi human rights activist, shot.
Peter Millar, 67, British journalist, stroke.
Tom Nairn, 90, Scottish political theorist, fall.
Gary Pettigrew, 78, American football player (Philadelphia Eagles, New York Giants), myelodysplastic syndrome.
Marek Plura, 52, Polish politician and psychotherapist, MEP (2014–2019), complications from spinal muscular atrophy.
Pino Roveredo, 68, Italian writer and theater director.
Kurt Schneider, 90, Austrian racing cyclist.
Bill Schonely, 93, American sports broadcaster (Portland Trail Blazers).
Harjit Singh Arora, 61, Indian Air Force officer, vice chief of the air staff (2019–2021).
Włodzimierz Sroka, 55, Polish economist and manager.
Stephanie Subercaseaux, 38, Chilean racing cyclist, suicide.
Ravipudi Venkatadri, 100, Indian philosopher.
Friedrich Weissensteiner, 95, Austrian historian and writer.
Gabrielle Williams, 59, Australian author, stroke.

22
Byram D. Avari, 81, Pakistani hotelier and sailor, owner of Avari Hotels.
Ian Black, 69, British journalist (The Guardian), and author (Israel's Secret Wars), complications from frontotemporal lobar degeneration.
Easley Blackwood Jr., 89, American composer (Twelve Microtonal Etudes for Electronic Music Media), pianist, and professor.
Lin Brehmer, 68, American disc jockey and radio personality (WXRT), prostate cancer.
Lady Martha Bruce, 101, British aristocrat, prison governor and army officer. 
Matthew H. Clark, 85, American Roman Catholic prelate, bishop of Rochester (1979–2012).
Gianfranco Goberti, 83, Italian painter.
David Hains, 92, Australian businessman and horse breeder.
Thomas Hellberg, 81, Swedish actor (Rederiet).
Darío Jara Saguier, 92, Paraguayan footballer (Rubio Ñu, Cerro Porteño, national team).
Vaughan Johnson, 75, Australian politician, Queensland MLA (1989–2015).
Octaviano Juarez-Corro, 49, Mexican-American fugitive (FBI Ten Most Wanted).
Masaru Konuma, 85, Japanese film director (Flower and Snake, Tattooed Flower Vase, Cloistered Nun: Runa's Confession), pneumonia.
Marianne Mantell, 93, German-born American writer and audiobook executive, co-founder of Caedmon Audio.
Seyed Abolhassan Mokhtabad, 53, Iranian journalist, heart attack.
Lenie de Nijs, 83, Dutch swimmer, European champion (1958).
Sal Piro, 72, American fan club president (The Rocky Horror Picture Show) and author (Creatures of the Night).
Zhanna Pliyeva, 73, Georgian composer and pianist.
Siddheshwar Prasad, 94, Indian politician, governor of Tripura (1995–2000) and MP (1962–1977).
Mario Pupella, 77, Italian actor (Angela, Salvo, Padrenostro) and theater director.
Hossein Shahabi, 55, Iranian film director (For the Sake of Mahdi, The Sale, The Bright Day) and screenwriter, lung infection.
Bernd Uhl, 76, German Roman Catholic prelate, auxiliary bishop of Freiburg (2001–2018).
Agustí Villaronga, 69, Spanish film director (In a Glass Cage, Moon Child, Black Bread), screenwriter and actor.
Sam Bass Warner Jr., 94, American historian.
Nikos Xanthopoulos, 88, Greek actor and singer, heart disease.

23
Joseph Agassi, 95, Israeli philosopher and author (The Continuing Revolution).
Pamela Kirkham, 16th Baroness Berners, 93, British hereditary peer, member of the House of Lords (1995–1999), stroke.
Patrizio Billio, 48, Italian footballer (Crystal Palace, Ancona, Dundee), heart attack.
Milton Bradley, 88, British racehorse trainer.
Álvaro Colom, 71, Guatemalan engineer, businessman and politician, president (2008–2012), cancer and pulmonary emphysema.
George Crabtree, 78, American physicist.
Paul A. David, 87, American economist and academic.
Jozef Dravecký, 75, Slovak diplomat.
Franklin Delano Floyd, 79, American murderer and rapist.
Hu Guangzhen, 95, Chinese electronic engineer, member of the Chinese Academy of Engineering.
Hiromitsu Kadota, 74, Japanese Hall of Fame baseball player (Nankai Hawks, Orix Braves).
Dolores Kondrashova, 86, Russian hairdresser.
Kweon Kab-yong, 65, South Korean Go player.
Serge Laget, 63, French board game designer (Mare Nostrum, Mystery of the Abbey).
William Lawvere, 85, American mathematician.
Fred Lindop, 84, British rugby league referee.
Edrissa Marong, 27, Gambian long-distance runner.
Eugenio Martín, 97, Spanish film director (Bad Man's River, The Ugly Ones, Horror Express) and screenwriter.
Victor Navasky, 90, American journalist (The Nation, Monocle, The New York Times Magazine).
Abd Rani Osman, 64, Malaysian politician, Selangor State MLA (2008–2018), heart disease.
Polo Polo, 78, Mexican comedian.
Everett Quinton, 71, American actor (Natural Born Killers, Pollock, Bros), glioblastoma.
E. Ramdoss, 66, Indian film director, screenwriter (Aayiram Pookkal Malarattum, Ravanan) and actor, heart attack.
Sami Sharaf, 93, Egyptian military officer.
Carol Sloane, 85, American jazz singer, complications from a stroke.
Top Topham, 75, English guitarist (The Yardbirds).
Valeri Urin, 88, Russian football player (Dynamo Moscow, Daugava Riga, Soviet Union national team) and manager.
Roland Weller, 84, French businessman, president of RC Strasbourg Alsace (1994–1997).

24
Zaza Aleksidze, 87, Georgian historian and linguist.
Oladejo Victor Akinlonu, 59, Nigerian artist.
Jean Anderson, 93, American cookbook author.
Benito Bollati, 96, Italian lawyer and politician, deputy (1974–1979).
B. V. Doshi, 95, Indian architect (CEPT University, Tagore Memorial Hall, Indian Institute of Management Bangalore), Pritzker Prize winner (2018).
Christelle Doumergue, 59, French basketball player (Clermont UC, Tango Bourges Basket, national team).
Mounir Jelili, 73, Tunisian Olympic handball player (1972, 1976).
Lance Kerwin, 62, American actor (James at 15, The Loneliest Runner, Salem's Lot).
Ole Didrik Lærum, 82, Norwegian oncologist and academic administrator, rector of the University of Bergen (1990–1995).
Mira Lehr, 88, American artist.
Li Zhao, 82, Chinese landmine expert, member of the Chinese Academy of Engineering.
George Magoha, 70, Kenyan surgeon and academic administrator, vice chancellor of the University of Nairobi (2005–2015) and minister of education (since 2019), cardiac arrest. 
Mònica Miquel Serdà, 60, Spanish politician, deputy (2003–2004).
Panteleimon, 87, Greek Orthodox prelate, metropolitan of Belgium and exarchate of the Netherlands and Luxembourg (1982–2013).
Jackson Rohm, 51, American singer-songwriter.

25
Wolfgang Altenburg, 94, German general, inspector general of the Bundeswehr (1983–1986) and chairman of the NATO Military Committee (1986–1989).
Taijirō Amazawa, 86, Japanese poet and scholar.
Khadija Assad, Moroccan actress, cancer.
Noah Cowan, 55, Canadian artistic director (TIFF Bell Lightbox, SFFILM), glioblastoma.
Maria Deroche, 84, Brazilian-born French architect.
Shimon Elituv, 85, Israeli Orthodox rabbi.
David Ewins, 80, British mechanical engineer.
Pamela Anne Gordon, 79, Canadian model.
Titewhai Harawira, 90, New Zealand Māori activist. 
Franciszek Jamroż, 79, Polish trade unionist and politician, mayor of Gdańsk (1991–1994).
Shantabai Kamble, 99, Indian writer.
Roger Louret, 72, French actor, playwright, and theatre director.
Bernhard T. Mittemeyer, 92, American lieutenant general, surgeon general of the U.S. Army (1981–1985).
Duncan Pugh, 48, Australian Olympic bobsledder (2010), brain aneurysm.
José Reis Pereira, 79, Brazilian politician, Piauí MLA (1987–1991).
Willie Richardson, 74, American civil rights activist.
Barbara Stanley, 73, American psychologist, ovarian cancer.
Bilal al-Sudani, Somali terrorist.
Cindy Williams, 75, American actress (Laverne & Shirley, American Graffiti, The Conversation).
John Gordon Williamson, 86, English cricketer (Northamptonshire, Durham, Cheshire).

26
Dave Albright, 63, American football player (Saskatchewan Roughriders), heart attack.
Rodolfo Ares, 68, Spanish politician, member of the Basque Parliament (1994–2009, 2012–2016).
Sayyid Ghulam Hussain Shah Bukhari, 90, Pakistani Islamic scholar.
Dean Daughtry, 76, American keyboard player (The Candymen, Classics IV, Atlanta Rhythm Section).
Sepp Dürr, 69, German politician, member of the Landtag of Bavaria (1998–2018), cancer.
Diana Fisher, 91, Australian television personality (The Inventors, Beauty and the Beast) and commentator, non-Hodgkin's lymphoma.
Zdeňka Hradilová, 84, Czech Olympic sprint canoer (1964).
Attilio Labis, 86, French ballet dancer and teacher.
Jessie Lemonier, 25, American football player (Los Angeles Chargers, Detroit Lions).
Eduard Lobau, 34, Belarusian political activist, shot.
Peter McCann, 74, American songwriter ("Do You Wanna Make Love", "Right Time of the Night") and musician.
Billy Packer, 82, American sports broadcaster and analyst (ACC, NCAA Final Four), kidney failure.
Gary Peters, 85, American baseball player (Chicago White Sox, Boston Red Sox).
Peter G. J. Pulzer, 93, Austrian-born British historian.
Judo. K. K. Rathnam, 92, Indian stuntman (Thamarai Kulam, Vallavan Oruvan, Thalai Nagaram).
Allan Ryan, 77, American attorney, heart attack.
Abdul Jabar Sabet, 78, Afghan politician, attorney general (2006–2008).
Edgar Schein, 94, Swiss-born American business theorist and psychologist.
Irvine Shillingford, 78, Dominican cricketer (West Indies, Combined Islands, Windward Islands).
Mesir Suryadi, 79, Indonesian politician, member of the People's Representative Council (2004–2009).
Keith Thomson, 81, New Zealand Olympic field hockey player (1968), and cricketer (Canterbury, national team).
Vo Van Ai, 87, Vietnamese poet, journalist and human-rights activist.
Wang Wei, 85, Chinese physicist, member of the Chinese Academy of Sciences.
Alice Wolf, 89, Austrian-born American politician, member of the Massachusetts House of Representatives (1996–2013), leukemia.

27
Albert Almanza, 86, Mexican Olympic basketball player (1960, 1964).
Anthony Arlidge, 85, British barrister and judge.
Bob Chrystal, 92, Canadian ice hockey player (New York Rangers).
Marcia G. Cooke, 68, American jurist, judge of the U.S. District Court for Southern Florida (since 2004).
Robert Dalva, 80, American film editor (The Black Stallion, Captain America: The First Avenger, Jumanji), lymphoma.
Gerard Escoda, 50, Spanish footballer (Reus, Villarreal) and sporting director (CE Sabadell), cancer.
Pietro Forquet, 97, Italian bridge player.
Gregory Allen Howard, 70, American screenwriter and film producer (Remember the Titans, Ali, Harriet), heart failure.
Shahidul Islam, 65, Bangladeshi politician, MP (2002–2006), complications from diabetes.
Jamuna, 86, Indian actress (Milan, Pandanti Kapuram) and politician, MP (1989–1991).
Gulmira Karimova, 45, Kazakh politician, senator (since 2023).
Aleksander Krawczuk, 100, Polish historian, minister of culture (1986–1989) and MP (1991–1997).
Alfred Leslie, 95, American painter and film director (Pull My Daisy), COVID-19.
Li Wenjun, 92, Chinese translator.
Emmie Lucassen-Reynders, 87, Dutch chemist.
Mikhail Mustygin, 85, Belarusian footballer (Avangard-Kortek, CSK MO, Dinamo Minsk).
Michiko Nagai, 97, Japanese historical fiction writer.
Albert Okura, 71, American businessman, founder of Juan Pollo, sepsis.
Saša Petrović, 61, Bosnian-Serbian actor (It's Hard to Be Nice, Fuse, Lud, zbunjen, normalan).
Ghislaine Pierie, 53, Dutch actress, film director, and stage director (Baantjer, Moordvrouw, SpangaS).
Peter G. J. Pulzer, 93, Austrian-born British historian.
Martin Purtscher, 94, Austrian politician, governor of Vorarlberg (1987–1997).
Alexander Pushnitsa, 73, Russian sambo practitioner, cancer.
William J. Riley, 75, American jurist, judge of the U.S. Court of Appeals for the Eighth Circuit (since 2001).
David Rimmer, 81, Canadian avant-garde filmmaker, and educator.
Floyd Sneed, 80, Canadian drummer (Three Dog Night).
Sylvia Syms, 89, English actress (At Home with the Braithwaites, The Queen, Ice Cold in Alex).
Ting Chiang, 86, Taiwanese actor (Four Loves, The Bold, the Corrupt, and the Beautiful, All in 700) and film director.
Isaac Trachtenberg, 99, Ukrainian toxicologist, member of the National Academy of Sciences of Ukraine.
Donald Trelford, 85, British journalist, editor of The Observer (1975–1993), cancer.
Derek Tulk, 88, English cricketer (Hampshire).
Daniel Lewis Williams, 79, American operatic basso profondo, complications from Alzheimer's disease. (death announced on this date)
Yang Yi, 103, Chinese literary translator.

28
Hilda Bettermann, 80, American politician, member of the Minnesota House of Representatives (1991–1999).
Jacques Bloch, 98, French resistance fighter.
Odd Børre, 83, Norwegian pop singer (Eurovision Song Contest 1968).
Gérard Caillaud, 76, French actor (The Accuser, L'argent des autres, The Dogs) and stage director.
Phil Coles, 91, Australian sports administrator and Olympic sprint canoeist (1960, 1964, 1968).
Amru Daulay, 83, Indonesian politician, regent of Mandailing Natal (2000–2010).
Garth Everett, 69, American politician, member of the Pennsylvania House of Representatives (2007–2020), cancer.
Hussain Rabi Gandhi, 74, Indian writer and political activist.
Jane F. Gardner, 88, British historian and academic.
Max Huwyler, 91, Swiss writer.
Stefan Kjernholm, 71, Swedish Olympic luger (1976, 1980).
Krister Kristensson, 80, Swedish footballer (Malmö, Trelleborg, national team).
Eva Kushner, 93, Canadian academic.
Viola Léger, 92, Canadian actress (Jerome's Secret) and politician, senator (2001–2005).
Kent Lockhart, 59, American-born Australian basketball player (Eastside Spectres, Albany Patroons).
Lisa Loring, 64, American actress (The Addams Family, Blood Frenzy, As the World Turns), stroke.
Paulo Roberto de Souza Matos, 78, Brazilian politician, deputy (1987–1991).
Evgeny Mogilevsky, 77, Russian pianist.
Adama Niane, 56, French actor (Baise-moi, Get In, Lupin).
Landon Pearson, 92, Canadian author and politician, senator (1994–2005).
Dan Ramos, 41, American politician, member of the Ohio House of Representatives (2011–2019).
Xavier Rubert de Ventós, 83, Spanish politician, philosopher, and writer, deputy (1982–1986) and MEP (1986–1994).
Harold Rusland, 84, Surinamese politician, minister of education (1980–1983).
Jaroslav Šedivý, 93, Czech politician, minister of foreign affairs (1997–1998).
Jiří Šetlík, 93, Czech art historian and academic.
Barrett Strong, 81, American singer ("Money (That's What I Want)") and songwriter ("I Heard It Through the Grapevine", "Papa Was a Rollin' Stone").
Carlo Tavecchio, 79, Italian football executive, president of the FIGC (2014–2017), lung disease.
Tom Verlaine, 73, American musician (Television), songwriter ("Marquee Moon") and producer (Sketches for My Sweetheart the Drunk).
Vasily Zakharyashchev, 77, Russian politician, deputy (2007–2011).

29
George Beven, 93–94, Sri Lankan-British artist.
Vito Chimenti, 69, Italian football player (Matera, Palermo, Taranto) and manager, heart attack.
Naba Das, 61, Indian politician, member of the Odisha Legislative Assembly (since 2009), shot.
John Devine, 82, Australian football player and coach (Geelong, North Hobart).
Vadym Dobizha, 81, Ukrainian football manager (Zorya Luhansk, JK Sillamäe Kalev).
Ross Gillespie, 87, New Zealand Olympic field hockey player (1960, 1964) and two-time Olympic coach.
Sitiveni Halapua, 73, Tongan politician, MP (2010–2014).
Brandon Jackson, 88, British Anglican priest, dean of Lincoln (1989–1997).
Barrie Juniper, 90, British plant scientist and author (The Carnivorous Plants).
Masood Sharif Khan Khattak, 72, Pakistani intelligence officer, director-general of the Intelligence Bureau (1993–1996).
Michael Krebs, 66, American actor (Field of Lost Shoes).
Heddy Lester, 72, Dutch singer and actress.
Hazel McCallion, 101, Canadian politician, mayor of Mississauga (1978–2014), pancreatic cancer.
Gerhard Moehring, 101, German teacher and local historian.
Henry Moore, 88, American football player (New York Giants, Baltimore Colts).
Simon Ifede Ogouma, 89, Beninese politician, minister of foreign affairs (1980–1982).
Dmytro Pavlychko, 93, Ukrainian poet, translator and diplomat, ambassador to Slovakia (1995–1998) and Poland (1999–2002).
George R. Robertson, 89, Canadian actor (Police Academy, E.N.G., JFK).
Gordon Rohlehr, 80, Guyanese academic.
Mandeep Roy, 73, Indian actor (Minchina Ota, Baadada Hoo, Benkiya Bale), cardiac arrest.
Roger Schank, 76, American artificial intelligence theorist.
Kyle Smaine, 31, American freestyle skier, avalanche.
Gopal Sri Ram, 79, Malaysian jurist, judge of the Federal Court (2009–2010), lung infection.
Will Steffen, 75, American-born Australian climatologist and chemist, pancreatic cancer.
Gero Storjohann, 64, German politician, MP (since 2002), member of the Landtag of Schleswig-Holstein (1994–2002).
Gabriel Tacchino, 88, French classical pianist.
Sidney Thornton, 68, American football player (Pittsburgh Steelers).
Vatti Vasant Kumar, 67, Indian politician, Andhra Pradesh MLA (2004–2014).
Piotr Waśko, 61, Polish politician, MP (2007–2011).
Annie Wersching, 45, American actress (24, The Last of Us, Runaways), cancer.
Graham Winteringham, 99, English architect (Crescent Theatre).
Gerhard Woitzik, 95, German politician.

30
John Adams, 71, American baseball superfan (Cleveland Indians/Guardians) and drummer.
Viktor Ageyev, 86, Russian water polo player, Olympic silver medallist (1960).
Jesús Aguilar Padilla, 70, Mexican politician, governor of Sinaloa (2005–2010).
Bobby Beathard, 86, American Hall of Fame football executive (Miami Dolphins, Washington Redskins, San Diego Chargers), complications from Alzheimer's disease.
Fernando Elboj Broto, 76, Spanish teacher and politician, senator (1982–1989, 2008–2011).
Pat Bunch, 83, American country music songwriter ("I'll Still Be Loving You", "Wild One", "Living in a Moment").
Andrew Grimwade, 92, Australian chemical engineer and scientist.
Ryszard Gryglewski, 90, Polish pharmacologist and physician.
Ann Harding, 64, Australian economist.
Sir Michael Heller, 86, British mining executive, chairman of Bisichi Mining and London & Associated Properties.
Donald M. Hess, 86, Swiss winemaker and art collector.
Bobby Hull, 84, Canadian Hall of Fame ice hockey player (Chicago Blackhawks, Winnipeg Jets, Hartford Whalers), Stanley Cup champion (1961).
John Bailey Jones, 95, American jurist and politician, judge of the U.S. District Court for South Dakota (since 1981) and member of the South Dakota House of Representatives (1956–1960).
László Kordás, 53, Hungarian trade unionist and politician, MP (since 2022), heart attack.
Ann McLaughlin Korologos, 81, American politician, U.S. secretary of labor (1987–1989), complications from meningitis.
Charly Loubet, 77, French footballer (Cannes, Nice, national team).
Gerald Mortag, 64, German cyclist, Olympic silver medallist (1980).
Linda Pastan, 90, American poet, cancer.
Ouyang Pingkai, 77, Chinese engineer and academic administrator, president of Nanjing Tech University (2001–2012) and member of the Chinese Academy of Engineering.
Shamsul Alam Pramanik, 70, Bangladeshi politician, MP (1996–2008), complications from diabetes.
Alexis Ravelo, 51, Spanish writer. 
Mike Schrunk, 80, American district attorney, complications from Alzheimer's disease.
Félix Sienra, 107, Uruguayan Olympic sailor (1948).
Charles Silverstein, 87, American writer (The Joy of Gay Sex), therapist and gay activist.
Pedo Terlaje, 76, American politician, member of the Legislature of Guam (since 2019).
James Alexander Thom, 89, American author.
K. V. Tirumalesh, 82, Indian writer and poet.
Jeff Vlaming, 63, American television writer and producer (The X-Files, Hannibal, The 100), cancer.

31
Louis-Charles Bary, 96, French trade unionist and politician, mayor of Neuilly-sur-Seine (2002–2008).
Cleonice Berardinelli, 106, Brazilian writer, member of the Brazilian Academy of Letters.
Shanti Bhushan, 97, Indian lawyer and politician, minister of law and justice (1977–1979).
Cleve Bryant, 75, American college football player (Ohio Bobcats) and coach (Illinois Fighting Illini, Texas Longhorns).
Lou Campanelli, 84, American basketball coach (James Madison Dukes, California Golden Bears).
Anna Czerwińska, 73, Polish mountaineer.
David Durenberger, 88, American politician, member of the U.S. Senate (1978–1995), heart failure.
Dave Elder, 47, American baseball player (Cleveland Indians).
Mark S. Golub, 77, American rabbi and media entrepreneur (Jewish Broadcasting Service).
Jorunn Hageler, 76, Norwegian politician, MP (1993–1997).
Donie Hanlon, 85, Irish Gaelic footballer (Gracefield, Offaly county).
Alan Hurst, 77, British politician, MP (1997–2005).
Kim Young-hee, 59, South Korean basketball player, Olympic silver medallist (1984), brain cancer.
Jan Kudra, 85, Polish Olympic cyclist (1964).
C. Lalitha, 84, Indian Carnatic singer (Bombay Sisters), heart attack.
Nicole Lattès, 84, French editor.
Luiz Suzin Marini, 87, Brazilian politician, Santa Catarina MLA (1991–1999).
Josefina Angélica Meabe, 83, Argentine rancher and politician, senator (2009–2015).
Willie Milne, 71, Scottish professional golfer, cardiac arrest.
Joe Moss, 92, American football player (Washington Redskins) and coach (Philadelphia Eagles, Toronto Argonauts).
Henrik Nordbrandt, 77, Danish poet (Drømmebroer), novelist and essayist.
Kadriye Nurmambet, 89, Romanian traditional folk singer and folklorist.
Luigi Pasinetti, 92, Italian economist.
Ilya São Paulo, 59, Brazilian actor (O Amuleto de Ogum, The Third Bank of the River, Amor de Mãe'').
Egon Schmidt, 91, Hungarian ornithologist and natural historian.
Tom Schoen, 77, American football player (Cleveland Browns).
Eddie Spence, 97, Northern Irish Gaelic footballer (Antrim).
Charlie Thomas, 85, American Hall of Fame singer (The Drifters), liver cancer.

References

2023-1
1